Ilhami is a Turkish given name for males. Notable people with the name include:

 Ilhami Çene (1909–1977), Turkish fencer
 Ilhami Çiçek (1954–1983), Turkish poet

See also
 Ilham

Turkish masculine given names